Tanzania meridionalis is a species of small jumping spider in the genus Tanzania that lives in South Africa. The male was first described in 2011.

References

Endemic fauna of South Africa
Salticidae
Spiders of South Africa
Spiders described in 2011